A Day at the Beach is a 1970 film written by Roman Polanski.

A Day at the Beach may also refer to:

 1962 book "A Day at the Beach" by Dutch author Simon Heere Heeresma.
 A Day at the Beach (album), a 1995 album by Sonia Dada
 A Day at the Beach, a 2005 book by Jim Toomey
 "A Day at the Beach", an episode of the Barney & Friends video Barney and the Backyard Gang
 "Day at the Beach (New Rays from an Ancient Sun)", a song by Joe Satriani from his 1989 album Flying in a Blue Dream